The list below shows the leading sire of Thoroughbred racehorses in North America for each year since 1830. This is determined by the amount of prize money won by the sire's progeny during the year. It is restricted to stallions which are based in North America, but currently includes earnings from overseas races in Great Britain, Ireland, France, Italy, Germany and the United Arab Emirates as well as domestic earnings.

Prior to 2015, the Leading Sire Lists published by The Blood-Horse excluded earnings from Hong Kong and Japan due to the disparity in purses. Starting in 2015, earnings from Hong Kong and Japan are included on an adjusted basis.

List 

 1830: Sir Charles (1)
 1831: Sir Charles (2)
 1832: Sir Charles (3)
 1833: Sir Charles (4)
 1834: Monsieur Tonson (1)
 1835: Bertrand (1)
 1836: Sir Charles (5)
 1837: Leviathan (1)
 1838: Leviathan (2)
 1839: Leviathan (3)
 1840: Medoc (1)
 1841: Medoc (2)
 1842: Priam (1)
 1843: Leviathan (4)
 1844: Priam (2)
 1845: Priam (3)
 1846: Priam (4)
 1847: Glencoe (1)
 1848: Leviathan (5) / Trustee (1)
 1849: Glencoe (2)
 1850: Glencoe (3)
 1851: Boston (1)
 1852: Boston (2)
 1853: Boston (3)
 1854: Glencoe (4)
 1855: Glencoe (5)
 1856: Glencoe (6)
 1857: Glencoe (7)
 1858: Glencoe (8)
 1859: Albion (1)
 1860: Revenue (1)
 1861: Lexington (1)
 1862: Lexington (2)
 1863: Lexington (3)
 1864: Lexington (4)
 1865: Lexington (5)
 1866: Lexington (6)
 1867: Lexington (7)
 1868: Lexington (8)
 1869: Lexington (9)
 1870: Lexington (10)
 1871: Lexington (11)
 1872: Lexington (12)
 1873: Lexington (13)
 1874: Lexington (14)
 1875: Leamington (1)
 1876: Lexington (15)
 1877: Leamington (2)
 1878: Lexington (16)
 1879: Leamington (3)
 1880: Bonnie Scotland (1)
 1881: Leamington (4)
 1882: Bonnie Scotland (2)
 1883: Billet (1)
 1884: Glenelg (1)
 1885: Virgil (1)
 1886: Glenelg (2)
 1887: Glenelg (3)
 1888: Glenelg (4)
 1889: Rayon d'Or (1)
 1890: St. Blaise (1)
 1891: Longfellow (1)
 1892: Iroquois (1)
 1893: Himyar (1)
 1894: Sir Modred (1)
 1895: Hanover (1)
 1896: Hanover (2)
 1897: Hanover (3)
 1898: Hanover (4)
 1899: Albert (1)
 1900: Kingston (1)
 1901: Sir Dixon (1)
 1902: Hastings (1)
 1903: Ben Strome (1)
 1904: Meddler (1)
 1905: Hamburg (1)
 1906: Meddler (2)
 1907: Commando (1)
 1908: Hastings (2)
 1909: Ben Brush (1)
 1910: Kingston (2)
 1911: Star Shoot (1)
 1912: Star Shoot (2)
 1913: Broomstick (1)
 1914: Broomstick (2)
 1915: Broomstick (3)
 1916: Star Shoot (3)
 1917: Star Shoot (4)
 1918: Sweep (1)
 1919: Star Shoot (5)
 1920: Fair Play (1)
 1921: Celt (1)
 1922: McGee (1)
 1923: The Finn (1)
 1924: Fair Play (2)
 1925: Sweep (2)
 1926: Man o' War (1)
 1927: Fair Play (3)
 1928: High Time (1)
 1929: Chicle (1)
 1930: Sir Gallahad III (1)
 1931: St. Germans (1)
 1932: Chatterton (1)
 1933: Sir Gallahad III (2)
 1934: Sir Gallahad III (3)
 1935: Chance Play (1)
 1936: Sickle (1)
 1937: The Porter (1)
 1938: Sickle (2)
 1939: Challenger II (1)
 1940: Sir Gallahad III (4)
 1941: Blenheim (1)
 1942: Equipoise (1)
 1943: Bull Dog (1)
 1944: Chance Play (2)
 1945: War Admiral (1)
 1946: Mahmoud (1)
 1947: Bull Lea (1)
 1948: Bull Lea (2)
 1949: Bull Lea (3)
 1950: Heliopolis (1)
 1951: Count Fleet (1)
 1952: Bull Lea (4)
 1953: Bull Lea (5)
 1954: Heliopolis (2)
 1955: Nasrullah (1)
 1956: Nasrullah (2)
 1957: Princequillo (1)
 1958: Princequillo (2)
 1959: Nasrullah (3)
 1960: Nasrullah (4)
 1961: Ambiorix (1)
 1962: Nasrullah (5)
 1963: Bold Ruler (1)
 1964: Bold Ruler (2)
 1965: Bold Ruler (3)
 1966: Bold Ruler (4)
 1967: Bold Ruler (5)
 1968: Bold Ruler (6)
 1969: Bold Ruler (7)
 1970: Hail to Reason (1)
 1971: Northern Dancer (1)
 1972: Round Table (1)
 1973: Bold Ruler (8)
 1974: T.V. Lark (1)
 1975: What a Pleasure (1)
 1976: What a Pleasure (2)
 1977: Dr. Fager (1), Northern Dancer (2)
 1978: Exclusive Native (1)
 1979: Exclusive Native (2)
 1980: Raja Baba (1)
 1981: Nodouble (1)
 1982: His Majesty (1)
 1983: Halo (1)
 1984: Seattle Slew (1)
 1985: Buckaroo (1)
 1986: Lyphard (1)
 1987: Mr. Prospector (1)
 1988: Mr. Prospector (2)
 1989: Halo (2)
 1990: Alydar (1)
 1991: Danzig (1)
 1992: Danzig (2)
 1993: Danzig (3)
 1994: Broad Brush (1)
 1995: Palace Music (1)
 1996: Cozzene (1)
 1997: Deputy Minister (1)
 1998: Deputy Minister (2)
 1999: Storm Cat (1)
 2000: Storm Cat (2)
 2001: Thunder Gulch (1)
 2002: El Prado (1)
 2003: A.P. Indy (1)
 2004: Elusive Quality (1)
 2005: Saint Ballado (1)
 2006: A.P. Indy (2)
 2007: Smart Strike (1)
 2008: Smart Strike (2)
 2009: Giant's Causeway (1)
 2010: Giant's Causeway (2)
 2011: Distorted Humor (1)
 2012: Giant's Causeway (3)
 2013: Kitten's Joy (1)
 2014: Tapit (1)
 2015: Tapit (2)
 2016: Tapit (3)
 2017: Unbridled's Song (1)
 2018: Kitten's Joy (2)
 2019: Into Mischief (1)
 2020: Into Mischief (2)
 2021: Into Mischief (3)
 2022: Into Mischief (4)

See also
 Leading sire in Australia
 Leading sire in France
 Leading sire in Germany
 Leading sire in Great Britain & Ireland
 Leading sire in Japan
 Leading broodmare sire in Japan
 Leading broodmare sire in Great Britain & Ireland
 Leading broodmare sire in North America

References

Sources 
 bloodhorse.com
 tbheritage.com

Horse racing in Canada
Horse racing in the United States